Dibble is a surname that may refer to:

Real people

In arts and entertainment
Ansen Dibell (1942–2006), American science fiction author
Scott Dibble (singer-songwriter), Canadian singer-songwriter, musician and record producer
Alan T Dibble (designer), Scottish knitwear designer.

In diplomacy
Philo Dibble (1951–2011), American diplomat

In politics
Clark B. Dibble, Michigan politician
Hamilton Dibble Jessup (1806–1892), doctor and political figure in the Canadian west
Samuel Dibble (1837–1913), Congressman from South Carolina
D. Scott Dibble (born 1965), American politician from Minnesota
Keith Dibble (born 1955), British politician, Councillor in Aldershot, Hampshire, and political figure in UK Labour Party.

In science
Charles E. Dibble (1909–2002), American anthropologist and linguist
Harold L. Dibble (1951-2018), American paleolithic archaeologist

In sport
Andy Dibble (born 1965), Welsh professional footballer
C. W. Dibble, football coach of University of Buffalo in 1897
Dorne Dibble (1929−2018), American football wide receiver for the Detroit Lions
Rob Dibble (born 1964), Major League Baseball pitcher

In other fields
Sheldon Dibble (1809–1845), American missionary to Hawaii
Barry Dibble (born 1958), British businessman, Councillor and past chairman of the Federation of Manufacturing Opticians.

Fictional characters
Officer Charlie Dibble, a fictional character in the cartoon series Top Cat